Jaranwala (Punjabi and ) is a subdivision (Tehsil) of Faisalabad District in the Punjab province of Pakistan. The industrial area, Khurrianwala, is located in Jaranwala, and Makuana. Jaranwala is subdivided into 57 Union Councils.

List of schools
 Govt primary and Secondary School for Boys ( Chak 57 R.B ) 
 Govt primary School for Girls ( Chak 57 R.B )
Govt High School Jaranwala (one of the Oldest School in Punjab)
Govt Islamia High School Jaranwala
Govt Girls High School MC 1 Jaranwala
Govt Girls High School MC 2 Cinema choke Jaranwala
Govt. High School For Boys (Chak 353 G.B)
Govt. Girls High  School (Chak 353 G.B)
Govt Girls Higher Secondary School (Chak 94 GB Shankar Tehsil Jaranwala)
Govt High School For Boys (Chak 376 G.B)
Govt Boys Center of Excellence Secondary School (Jaranwala Town)
Govt Primary School for girls and boys (Chak 238 GB II Kamuana)
Govt High School 583 gb

Demographics
According to the 2017 Census of Pakistan, Jaranwala Tehsil has a population of 1,492,276 and has 228,790 households. Its natives speak the Jatki dialect of Punjabi, while others speak other dialects, such as Majhi and Doabi.

References 

Tehsil municipal administrations of Faisalabad
Tehsils of Punjab, Pakistan